Biscarrosse is a commune in the Landes department in Nouvelle-Aquitaine in southwestern France.

Near Biscarrosse is the CEL (national test centre) from which numerous French military rockets have been launched for test purposes. Likewise, the CEL has facilities for launching civilian rockets to study the upper atmosphere.

Near the town centre, outside the Café de l'orme, there was what is believed to have been the oldest elm tree in Europe. Planted in 1350, this Field Elm Ulmus minor died in 2010 after finally succumbing to Dutch elm disease. Legend has it that girls deemed promiscuous were forced to stand naked upon a barrel beneath the tree for a day. One unfortunate, unjustly accused, died of shame, the tree annually producing a corona of blanched leaves in her memory.

The commune has an airport, called Biscarrosse - Parentis Airport.

Etymology 

The toponym Biscarrosse derives from the Aquitanian language or directly from the Basque word bizkar, meaning 'low ridge' or 'prominence' followed by the Aquitanian suffix -ossum/-os, that was used to mark presence. Related toponyms are Biscay and Biscarrués.

Climate

Population

Seaplane activity
Nearby Hourtiquet once hosted an important seaplane base, serving the builder Latécoère and airlines Aéropostale and its successor Air France. A seaplane museum exists at the shores of the Lac de Biscarrosse et de Parentis.

During World War II the base served German military seaplanes; two Dornier 24 flying boats were recovered from the lake in 1980 and 1981.

Since 1991, the lake has seen bi-annual seaplane fly-ins.

Oil exploration
After the demise of seaplanes after World War II, the lake gained new interest at the discovery of petroleum. It has the greatest reserve in France. Petroleum exploitation is situated on the shores of the lake, in the commune of Parentis.

Education
 École nationale de l'aviation civile

References

External links 

Univ-perp
Astronautix
Tourist Office
Biscaloc

Communes of Landes (department)